Sara Goffi (born 25 July 1981) is an Italian former freestyle swimmer who competed in the 2000 Summer Olympics.

References

1981 births
Living people
Italian female freestyle swimmers
Olympic swimmers of Italy
Swimmers at the 2000 Summer Olympics
European Aquatics Championships medalists in swimming
Mediterranean Games bronze medalists for Italy
Mediterranean Games medalists in swimming
Swimmers at the 2001 Mediterranean Games